Rim of the World Unified School District is a school district headquartered in Blue Jay, unincorporated San Bernardino County, California. It consists of three elementary schools, one middle school and one high school.

Schools

Secondary schools
 Rim of the World High School (Nicknamed "Rim HS")
Mountain High School (alternative school)
 Mary Putnam Henck Intermediate School

Primary schools
 Charles Hoffman Elementary School
 Lake Arrowhead Elementary School
 Valley of Enchantment Elementary School
 Lake Gregory Elementary (closed)
 Grandview Elementary (closed)

References

External links

 Rim of the World Unified School District

School districts in San Bernardino County, California